Deschutes River may refer to:
Deschutes River (Oregon)
Little Deschutes River (Oregon), a tributary of the Deschutes River in Oregon
Deschutes River (Washington)
 River De Chute in Maine